Hamid Ferej was born in Barka, Eritrea. He was a prominent figure in Eritrean politics. In the year 1956 he was elected to be the president of the Eritrean parliament. He was the president of the Eritrean parliament from the year 1956 to 1962.

References

Eritrean politicians
Living people
Year of birth missing (living people)